Sefer HaRazim ("Book of Secrets") is a Jewish magical text supposedly given to Noah by the angel Raziel, and passed down throughout Biblical history until it ended up in the possession of Solomon, for whom it was a great source of his wisdom and purported magical powers. Note that this is not the same work as the Sefer Raziel HaMalakh, which was given to Adam by the same angel, although both works stem from the same tradition, and large parts of Sefer HaRazim were incorporated into the Sefer Raziel under its original title. 

It is thought to be a sourcebook for Jewish magic, calling upon angels rather than God to perform supernatural feats.

Discovery 
The text was rediscovered in the 20th century by Mordecai Margalioth, a Jewish scholar visiting Oxford in 1963, using fragments found in the Cairo Geniza.  He hypothesised that several fragments of Jewish magical literature shared a common source and was certain that he could reconstruct this common source.  He achieved this in 1966 when he published Sefer HaRazim. The first English translation of the book was undertaken by Michael A. Morgan in 1983; the book is now in print, as of summer 2007. A new scholarly edition of the main extant manuscript including Hebrew and Judeo-Arabic Geniza fragments and a 13th-century Latin translation was prepared by Bill Rebiger and Peter Schäfer in 2009, along with a translation and commentary in German in a separate volume.

Dating 
Margalioth places the date of the original text to the early fourth or late third century CE. This date is almost universally accepted; a notable exception is Ithamar Gruenwald who dates the text to the sixth or seventh century. Nonetheless, it is clear that this text predates Kabbalistic texts, including the Zohar (thirteenth century), the Bahir (thirteenth century as well), and possibly the proto-Kabbalistic Sefer Yetzirah (fourth century). There are certain textual clues that point toward this early date, specifically the reference to "the Roman indictions in 1:27-28 [which] gives a clear terminus a quo of 297 CE" (Morgan 8).

Structure and content 
The book is split into seven sections, not including a preface which details the book's reception and transmission. Each of the first six sections corresponds to one heaven and contains a listing of angels and instructions to perform one or more magical rites. Only the throne of God and the four hayots are in the seventh heaven. There is an uneasy tension between the orthodox cosmogony of the book and the unorthodox praxeis embodied in these magical rites; the book has obviously been edited by a rabbinical scribe, but the "popular religion" contained in the book is more or less intact. Some of the rituals purport to facilitate healing, prophecy, an attack upon one's enemy, and gaining good fortune. The number seven, the importance of divine names, and the prevalence of sympathetic magic all have significance in the literature of Middle Eastern magic. The text demonstrates strong syncretism of Jewish and Greek traditions; an example is a prayer to the sun god Helios to invoke him at night:

The prayer is preceded by instructions to call on several angels 21 times as well as the name of the sun. The reader is told to perform the ritual in white garments.

The Mandaean uthra (angel or guardian) Ptahil is mentioned in Sefer HaRazim, listed among other angels who stand on the ninth step of the second firmament.

References

Sources 
Levy, B. Barry. Sepher Ha-Razim, Unpublished manuscript and English translation, McGill University.
Margalioth, Mordecai. Sepher Ha-Razim. Jerusalem: Yediot Achronot, 1966.
Morgan, Michael A.  Sepher Ha-Razim: The Book of Mysteries. Chico, CA: Scholars Press, 1983. The majority of the information for this article is from this book.
Rebiger, Bill; Schäfer, Peter (eds.). Sefer ha-Razim I und II. Das Buch der Geheimnisse, vol. 1: Edition, vol. 2: Einleitung, Übersetzung und Kommentar. Tübingen: Mohr Siebeck, 2009.

Angels in Judaism
Jewish grimoires
Kabbalah texts
Hebrew-language names